Meet the Vogues is the debut album by The Vogues. It was released on a small Pittsburgh-based label called Co & Ce Records, co-founded by Herb Cohen and Nick Cenci.  It featured their first hit single, "You're the One", a cover of a song originally recorded by Petula Clark, plus eleven other covers of recent popular songs.

Track listing

References

The Vogues albums
1965 debut albums